In enzymology, a lipopolysaccharide N-acetylglucosaminyltransferase is an enzyme that catalyzes the chemical reaction

UDP-N-acetyl-D-glucosamine + lipopolysaccharide  UDP + N-acetyl-D-glucosaminyllipopolysaccharide

Thus, the two substrates of this enzyme are UDP-N-acetyl-D-glucosamine and lipopolysaccharide, whereas its two products are UDP and N-acetyl-D-glucosaminyllipopolysaccharide.

This enzyme participates in lipopolysaccharide biosynthesis and glycan structures - biosynthesis 2.

Nomenclature 

This enzyme belongs to the family of glycosyltransferases, specifically the hexosyltransferases.  The systematic name of this enzyme class is UDP-N-acetyl-D-glucosamine:lipopolysaccharide N-acetyl-D-glucosaminyltransferase. Other names in common use include UDP-N-acetylglucosamine-lipopolysaccharide, N-acetylglucosaminyltransferase, uridine diphosphoacetylglucosamine-lipopolysaccharide, and acetylglucosaminyltransferase.

References 

 

EC 2.4.1
Enzymes of unknown structure